The 2013–14 Monterrey Flash season was the first season of the new Monterrey Flash professional indoor soccer club. The Monterrey Flash, a Central Division team in the Professional Arena Soccer League, played their home games in Arena Monterrey in Monterrey, Nuevo León, Mexico.

The team was led by owner Gerardo Guerra Lozano and head coach Genoni Martínez with assistant coach Marco Coria. The team finished the regular season with a 13–3 record, good enough for 3rd in the Central Division and qualified for the post-season. They were eliminated in the Central Division Final by Hidalgo La Fiera.

Season summary
The Flash started their debut season strong with an overtime win over Hidalgo La Fiera then six more victories, including only the second shootout in PASL history. Their first loss also came against Hidalgo on December 15. The Flash split the season series with their cross-border rivals, each club winning its two home matches. Their only other loss came against the visiting San Diego Sockers on January 26. Originally scheduled to wrap the regular season on February 2, the game against Saltillo Rancho Seco was re-scheduled for February 16 to avoid conflicting with Super Bowl XLVIII. The Flash finished 13–3 and secured the third spot in the Central Division playoffs. They defeated the Dallas Sidekicks in the Division Semifinal then lost to Hidalgo La Fiera in the Division Final.

The Monterrey Flash, along with the other two Mexico-based PASL teams, did not participate in the 2013–14 United States Open Cup for Arena Soccer.

History
The previous team to bear the Monterrey Flash name joined the Liga Mexicana de Futbol Rápido Profesional (LMFRPro) in 2011. They won the LMFRPro league championship in that first season then finished second to the San Diego Sockers in the 2012 FIFRA Club Championship. In September 2012, Lozano relocated the team to Texas, renamed them the Rio Grande Valley Flash, and  the PASL. In July 2013, the team announced that Victor Fernandez had assumed ownership of the franchise and renamed it "La Fiera FC".

Lozano returned to Monterrey and started a new Monterrey Flash with the intention of playing in both the LMFRPro and the PASL. The new Flash are one of three Mexico-based teams (along with Saltillo Rancho Seco and Toros Mexico) participating in the PASL for the 2013–14 season.

Roster moves
Legendary Argentinian midfielder Walter Gaitán joined the Flash roster at the start of the season but announced his intention to return to Argentina after the November 21 match against Saltillo Rancho Seco.

In early December 2013, the Flash acquired forward Victor Martinez Baez from Saltillo Rancho Seco.

Awards and honors
On November 19, 2013, the Professional Arena Soccer League named forward Erick Tovar as the PASL Player of the Week. The league cited his outstanding offensive contribution to his team's success, including multiple game-winning goals.

On February 26, 2014, the PASL announced its "All-League" honors. Defender Genoni Martinez was one of six players named to the All-League First Team.

Schedule

Exhibition

Regular season

♥ Rescheduled from February 2 at league request.

Post-season

References

External links
Monterrey Flash official website
Monterrey Flash at Vavel
Professional Arena Soccer League at Vavel

Monterrey Flash
Monterrey Flash
Monterrey Flash